Stanisław Kazimierz Gościniak (born 18 July 1944) is a Polish former volleyball player and coach, a member of the Poland national team from 1965 to 1974, and the 1974 World Champion. He was a participant in the 1968 and 1972 Summer Olympics. Gościniak was inducted into the Volleyball Hall of Fame in 2005.

Honours

As a player
 CEV European Champions Cup 
  1972/1973 – with Resovia
 National championships
 1970/1971  Polish Championship, with Resovia
 1971/1972  Polish Championship, with Resovia
 1973/1974  Polish Championship, with Resovia
 1974/1975  Polish Cup, with Resovia
 1974/1975  Polish Championship, with Resovia

As a coach
 National championships
 1989/1990  Polish Championship, with AZS Częstochowa
 1993/1994  Polish Championship, with AZS Częstochowa
 1994/1995  Polish Championship, with AZS Częstochowa
 1995/1996  Polish SuperCup, with AZS Częstochowa
 1996/1997  Polish Championship, with AZS Częstochowa
 1997/1998  Polish Cup, with AZS Częstochowa

Individual awards
 1974: FIVB World Championship – Most Valuable Player

State awards
 1995:  Gold Cross of Merit
 2012:  Officer's Cross of Polonia Restituta

References

External links
 
 
 Player profile at Volleyhall.org
 Coach/Player profile at Volleybox.net

1944 births
Living people
Sportspeople from Poznań
Polish men's volleyball players
Polish volleyball coaches
Olympic volleyball players of Poland
Volleyball players at the 1968 Summer Olympics
Volleyball players at the 1972 Summer Olympics
Recipients of the Gold Cross of Merit (Poland)
Officers of the Order of Polonia Restituta
Gwardia Wrocław players
Resovia (volleyball) players
AZS Częstochowa coaches
Setters (volleyball)